The Hovawart is a medium to large size German dog breed.

The name means "yard-watcher" or "farm-watcher", from the Middle High German words hova ("court", "yard", "farm", modern Standard German: Hof) and wart ("watchman", modern Standard German: Wart).

Description

Appearance 
The Hovawart is a medium-large dog. The correct color descriptions are black, black and gold, and blond.

Temperament 
The Hovawart is an outstanding watch dog and somewhat reserved towards strangers. They make excellent family dogs as they are completely devoted to their family. They are a working dog breed, and require a consistent and loving yet strict training and meaningful activity throughout their lives.

History 

Following the medieval period, the popularity of the Hovawart began to decline. Newer breeds such as the German Shepherd Dog slowly replaced the Hovawart as a guard and working dog until it had almost disappeared by the beginning of the twentieth century. Around 1915 a group of enthusiasts decided to try to save the breed. Predominant in this group was the zoologist Kurt Friedrich König. They started by looking for dogs in the farms of the Black Forest region. König then started a careful breeding program using these dogs and crossed them with Kuvasz specimens, Newfoundlands, German Shepherd Dogs, Leonbergers, a Bernese Mountain Dog and an African hunting dog. After much work, the group was rewarded in 1922 when the first Hovawart litter was entered into the German Breeding Registry. The enthusiasts continued their work and in 1937 the German Kennel Club officially recognised the Hovawart. All this work was almost undone with the outbreak of the Second World War. Because of their abilities many Hovawarts were used in the German war effort and perished. By 1945 only a few remained. Enthusiasm for the breed remained and in 1947, Otto Schramm and some fellow enthusiasts in Coburg formed a new club, the Rassezuchtverein für Hovawart-Hunde Coburg which is still in existence today. In 1964 the German Kennel Club recognised the Hovawart as the country's seventh working breed.

Miscellaneous 
The Hovawart does exceptionally well in search and rescue, tracking and working dog activities. The females are generally lighter in build.

See also
 Dogs portal
 List of dog breeds

References

External links 

 

Dog breeds originating in Germany
FCI breeds
Livestock guardian dogs